Acuff is a surname. Notable people with the surname include:

Amy Acuff (born 1975), American athlete
Eddie Acuff (1903–1956), American actor
Roy Acuff (1903–1992), American musician
Ruth Acuff, American singer-songwriter

See also
Acuff, Texas
Acuff-Rose Music, American publishing firm